The  Asian Men's Volleyball Championship was the fourth staging of the Asian Men's Volleyball Championship, a quadrennial international volleyball tournament organised by the Asian Volleyball Confederation (AVC) with Kuwait Volleyball Association (KVA). The tournament was held in Kuwait City, Kuwait from 15 to 25 October 1987.

Preliminary round

Pool A

|}

|}

Pool B

|}

|}

Pool C

|}

|}

Pool D

|}

|}

Classification round

Pool E

|}

|}

Pool F

|}

|}

Pool G
Information is not available

|}

|}

Pool H
Information is not available

|}

|}

Final round

Classification 13th–16th

13th–16th semifinals
|}

15th place match
|}

13th place match
|}

Classification 9th–12th

9th–12th semifinals
|}

11th place match
|}

9th place match
|}

Classification 5th–8th

5th–8th semifinals
|}

7th place match
|}

5th place match
|}

Championship

Semifinals
|}

3rd place match
|}

Final
|}

Final standing

References
Results

A
V
Asian men's volleyball championships
International volleyball competitions hosted by Kuwait